I Have Lived is a 1933 American drama film directed by Richard Thorpe and starring Alan Dinehart, Anita Page and Allen Vincent.

Plot 
A playwright discovers an actress to star in his latest play, unaware of her secret background.

Cast
 Alan Dinehart as Thomas Langley  
 Anita Page as Jean St. Clair  
 Allen Vincent as Warren White 
 Gertrude Astor as Harriet Naisson  
 Maude Truax as Mrs. Genevieve 'Mousie' Reynolds  
 Matthew Betz as Blackie 
 Eddie Boland as Sidney Cook  
 Florence Dudley as First Actress  
 Gladys Blake as Second Actress  
 Dell Henderson as J.W.  
 Harry C. Bradley as Small Town Man  
 Edward Keane as Leading Man

References

Bibliography
 Michael R. Pitts. Poverty Row Studios, 1929–1940: An Illustrated History of 55 Independent Film Companies, with a Filmography for Each. McFarland & Company, 2005.

External links
 

1933 films
1933 drama films
American black-and-white films
American drama films
Chesterfield Pictures films
Films directed by Richard Thorpe
1930s English-language films
1930s American films